Ranala is a town  in the Nandurbar subdivision of Nandurbar district in Nashik division of Kandesh region of Maharashtra state in India.Ranala village in most Population is "TAMBOLI" Samaj, they are traditional business is Betel leaves sellers. 

Cities and towns in Nandurbar district
Talukas in Maharashtra